Senate House may refer to:
 The building housing a legislative senate
 List of legislative buildings
Senate House State Historic Site, in Kingston, New York, where the state's first Constitution was ratified in 1777.
 The building (formerly) housing an academic senate 
Senate House, London of the University of London
 Senate House Libraries, based in the building 
Senate House, Cambridge of the University of Cambridge
Senate House (University of Madras)